Feet of Clay (stylized in all caps) is the second extended play by American rapper Earl Sweatshirt. It was released on November 1, 2019, through Tan Cressida and Warner Records. A deluxe edition, also included on the vinyl and CD copies, was released digitally July 24, 2020, including two bonus tracks.

Track listing 

Notes
 All track titles are stylized in all caps.

Sample credits
 "Mtomb" contains a sample from "Theme for the People" by Mtume, written by James Mtume and Reggie Lucas.
 "El Toro Combo Meal" contains a sample from "Your Kiss of Fire" by The Hopkins Bros., written by Lyman and Frank Hopkins.
 "4N" contains a sample from "Let Me Love You," written and performed by Michael Henderson, co-written by Ray Parker, Jr.

Personnel
 Earl Sweatshirt – vocals, programming , engineering, mixing
 Liv.e – featured background vocals 
 Mavi – featured vocals 
 Mach-Hommy – featured vocals , programming 
 Maxo - featured vocals 
 Navy Blue - featured vocals 
 The Alchemist – programming 
 ovrkast. – programming 
 Black Noise - programming 
 Swarvy – additional programming 
 Joe Visciano – mixing
 Chris Athens – mastering

Charts

References

2019 EPs
Earl Sweatshirt albums
Albums produced by the Alchemist (musician)
Albums produced by Earl Sweatshirt